Zou Jie (Chinese:邹捷; born January 17, 1981, in Dalian) is a former Chinese football player.

Club career
Zou Jie began his professional football career for Dalian Shide in the 2000 league season, making two appearances. He rose to prominence in the 2001 Chinese season when he played in 20 games, scoring 8 goals, playing a vital part in the title winning team and would personally win the Young player of the year award. Establishing himself as a first-choice regular within the team, he would win several more league titles and Chinese FA Cup with Dalian, with the 2005 season being his most prolific when he scored 15 goals in 23 appearances. In the 2008 league season Dalian Shide would have an extremely unproductive season, which saw them flirt with relegation and this saw Xu Hong to come in as head coach, where he viewed Zou Jie as surplus to requirements, eventually leading to a loan deal to second-tier club Shenyang Dongjin during the 2009 league season. Zou returned to professional football in March 2017, joining China League Two club Hainan Boying.

International career
Zou Jie was called up to the senior national team on June 19, 2005, in a friendly against Costa Rica in a 2–2 draw. After several further friendlies Zou Jie would play his first competitive game against Palestine in an Asian Cup qualifier on February 22, 2006, that China won 2–0. This was then followed by another Asian Cup qualifier game against Iraq where China lost 2–1 on March 1, 2006. The Chinese Head coach Zhu Guanghu would deem Zou Jie's performances as unsatisfactorily and did not recall him in any further squads.

Honours

Club
Dalian Shide
Chinese Jia-A League/Chinese Super League: 2000, 2001, 2002, 2005
Chinese FA Cup: 2001, 2005

Individual
 CFA Young Player of the Year: 2001

References

External links
Player profile at Sina.com

Player stats at Sohu.com

1981 births
Living people
Chinese footballers
Footballers from Dalian
China international footballers
Dalian Shide F.C. players
Shenyang Dongjin players
Zhejiang Yiteng F.C. players
Chinese Super League players
China League One players
Association football forwards